Raymond A. J. Chrétien  (born May 20, 1942) is a Canadian lawyer and diplomat.  He served as Canada's ambassador to the United States from 1994–2000. His uncle Jean Chrétien, was the 20th prime minister of Canada from 1993 to 2003.

He holds many honours and titles, including Officer of the Order of Canada, Commander in the Legion of Honour (France) and Officer of the Order of the Aztec Eagle. In 2019 He was promoted within the Order of Canada to the highest grade of Companion by Governor General Julie Payette. This will give him the Post Nominal Letters "CC" for Life.

Early years
Born and raised in Shawinigan, Quebec, Chrétien graduated with a Bachelor's degree from Séminaire de Joliette (now part of Cégep régional de Lanaudière) and then Laval University in Law.

Diplomatic career
After being admitted to the Quebec Bar, Chrétien entered the Legal Affairs Bureau of the Department of External Affairs and the Department of Foreign Affairs in 1966.

His positions include:

 Democratic Republic of the Congo (Zaire): 1978–1981
 Mexico: 1985–1988
 Belgium: 1991–1994
 United States: 1994–2000
 France: 2000–2003

From 1988 to 1991, Chrétien was an associate in the office of the Secretary of State for External Affairs. In 1996, he was named Special Envoy to the U.N. for the Great Lakes and Central Africa.

Post-Government Career
In 2004, he joined the law firm Fasken Martineau DuMoulin and in December 2005, joined the Pierre Elliott Trudeau Foundation. Since April 2004, he is Chairman of the board of the Centre for International Studies of the Université de Montréal (CÉRIUM). He was appointed an Officer of the Order of Canada in 2010.

He is also a member of the Trilateral Commission.

Personal life

Chrétien is the nephew of former prime minister Jean Chrétien. He is married to Kay Rousseau; they have two children—Caroline Chrétien and Louis-François Chrétien.

In addition to his native French, Chrétien is fluent in English and Spanish.

See also
 Université Laval

References

External links 
 Raymond Chrétien page at CÉRIUM
 

1942 births
Living people
Ambassadors of Canada to the United States
Ambassadors of Canada to France
Companions of the Order of Canada
Ambassadors of Canada to Belgium
Ambassadors of Canada to Mexico
Ambassadors of Canada to the Republic of the Congo
Université Laval alumni
People from Shawinigan